Global Finance is an English-language monthly financial magazine. The magazine was founded in 1987 by Joseph D. Giarraputo, the founder and former publisher of Venture, Carl G. Burgen, Stephan Spahn, H. Allen Fernald, and Paolo Panerai, and covers the topic of financial globalization. The magazine's primary target audience consists of Chairmen, Presidents, CEOs, CFOs, Treasurers, and other financial officers. The magazine is distributed in 158 countries, with 50,050 global subscribers and recipients, certified by BPA Worldwide.

Global Finance Media, Inc's majority shareholder is Class Editori Group SpA, an Italian publishing company that produces two financial newspapers, lifestyle magazines, news agencies, digital televisions, etc. Joseph D. Giarraputo is the second-largest shareholder.

Global Finance has offices in New York, London, Milan and Rio de Janeiro.

Features
Global Finance reports on the international finance sector, covering such topics as corporate finance, joint ventures and M&A, country profiles, capital markets, investor relations, currencies, banking, risk management, custody, direct investment, and money management.

The magazine also holds several awards ceremonies throughout the year to recognize the winning financial institutions and companies. The largest of these ceremonies is held contemporary to the IMF and World Bank annual meetings.

World’s Best Banks
Each year, the magazine publishes a list of "world's best banks". Global Finance describes the rankings: "The winners are not always the biggest banks but rather the best—those with the qualities that corporations should look for when choosing a bank. These are banks with effective risk management systems, quality service and best practices in corporate governance."

World’s Safest Banks
The top 50 world's safest banks is annually published by the magazine.

See also
The Banker
CFO
Chief Executive Magazine

References

External links
Official Site

Business magazines published in the United States
Monthly magazines published in the United States
Magazines established in 1987
Magazines published in New York City